Rick Derksen  (born 1964) is a Dutch linguist and Indo-Europeanist at the University of Leiden who specializes in Balto-Slavic historical linguistics with an emphasis on accentology and etymology.

Dersken is a contributor to Leiden-based Indo-European Etymological Dictionary project, for which he wrote the Etymological Dictionary of the Slavic Inherited Lexicon  (Brill, 2008) and the Etymological Dictionary of the Baltic Inherited Lexicon (Brill, 2015).

Derksen's law

Overview

According to the law, the forms with the suffixes *-to-, *-sto-, *-tlo- had the Balto-Slavic final accent. Namely, in the Proto-Lithuanian language, the accent was retracted from short vowels to the previous syllable, as a result of which the accent appeared on the syllable with an unstressed acute transformed into circumflex.

Examples

Proto-Slavic *bydlò.

References

Living people
Linguists from the Netherlands
Academic staff of Leiden University
1964 births
Linguists of Indo-European languages
Balticists
Slavists